Fantastic is the debut studio album by Danish bubblegum dance duo Toy-Box. It includes the hits "The Sailor Song", "Teddybear", "Best Friend" and "Tarzan & Jane". It was released in January 1999, and later released in May 1999. The Singapore edition included the "Toy-Box Space Trap" video game for the PC. The Special Christmas Edition of the Fantastic Album featured a bonus track; So Merry Christmas Everyone (X-MAS Bonus) produced & arranged for Candy Hell Entertainment. The artwork resembles to the layout of European PlayStation games.

Toy-Box videos 
Toy-Box released music videos for "The Sailor-Song", "Best Friend", "Tarzan & Jane", and "Teddybear."  Most of Toy-Box's videos could be considered cartoonish, but "Teddybear" is a more realistic video.  While "Best Friend" features Amir El-Falaki and Aneela Mirza having a neon sword fight and turning into little fuzz balls, "The Sailor Song" showed several men flying off a boat, and "Tarzan and Jane" featured live monkeys and elephants in a cartoon parody, "Teddy Bear" is set in Paris and showed Amir and Aneela in a more romantic way than the other videos.

Commercial performance 
As of August 1999, the album has reached worldwide sales of 300,000 sold copies, with 80,000 units sold in Denmark.

Track listing 
 "Toy-Box Pictures Presents" – 0:38
 "The Sailor Song" – 3:15
 "Best Friend" – 3:28
 "Tarzan & Jane" – 3:04
 "E.T." – 3:40
 "Teddybear" – 4:14
 "Super-Duper-Man" – 3:17
 "I Believe in You" – 3:29
 "Earth, Wind, Water & Fire" – 3:36
 "What About" – 3:40
 "Eenie, Meenie, Miney, Mo" – 3:17
 "A Thing Called Love" – 3:16
 "Sayonara (Goodbye)" – 3:25

 Christmas edition bonus track
 "So Merry Christmas Everyone" – 3:55

 Special edition bonus videos
 "Best Friend"
 "The Sailor Song"

Singles 
 "Tarzan & Jane" (1998)
 "Best Friend" (1998)
 "The Sailor Song" (1999)

Promotional single 
 "Teddybear" (2000)

Charts

References

External links 
 Toy-Box
 Toy-Box at Bubblegum Dancer

1999 debut albums
Toy-Box albums
Victor Entertainment albums
Edel-Mega Records albums